The men's 10,000 metres walk at the 2018 IAAF World U20 Championships was held at Ratina Stadium on 14 July.

Records

Results

References

10,000 metres walk
Racewalking at the World Athletics U20 Championships